Stakhanov is a Russian surname which has derived from the Turkic name Stakhan, another version states that the name has derived from  - as Stachys the Apostle or Evstakhiy.

 Alexey Stakhanov, a famous Russian innovator of mining industry in the Soviet Union and founder of the Stakhanovite movement
 Nikolai Stakhanov, a commander of border forces of the USSR during World War II, a minister of Internal Affairs of the USSR and the Russian SFSR

References

Russian-language surnames